James Leo Wallace (November 14, 1881 - May 16, 1953)  was a professional baseball player. He batted .207 in his brief major league career, going 6-for-29 with 3 RBI.

Sources

Major League Baseball outfielders
Pittsburgh Pirates players
Baseball players from Massachusetts
Haverhill Hustlers players
Rochester Bronchos players
Toronto Maple Leafs (International League) players
Brockton Tigers players
Hartford Senators players
Lynn Shoemakers players
Lynn Leonardites players
Worcester Busters players
1881 births
1953 deaths